Grzegorz Krychowiak (born 29 January 1990) is a Polish professional footballer who plays as a defensive midfielder for Saudi Arabian club Al-Shabab, on loan from Krasnodar, and the Poland national team.

Beginning his senior career in France with Bordeaux, he later played for Reims, before joining Sevilla for €3.5 million in 2014, winning the UEFA Europa League in both of his two seasons at the club.

Krychowiak has earned over 90 caps for Poland since his international debut in 2008, and represented the nation at the UEFA European Championship in 2016 and 2020 and the FIFA World Cup in 2018 and 2022.

Club career

Early career

Although initially not a big fan of football, Krychowiak became involved in the sport at his brother's insistence and left home at the age of 12 to join a sports academy. He then joined the academies of various clubs, including Orzeł Mrzeżyno, Żaki 94 Kołobrzeg, Stal Szczecin, and Arka Gdynia.

During the France U16 and Poland U16 in Strasbourg, Krychowiak's performance attracted interests by Philippe Goubet, leading him to join Bordeaux in 2006. He then progressed through the ranks of the club's youth system and signed his first professional contract with them.

Stade Reims (loan)

Having previously rejected a return to Poland, joining Arka Gdynia, it was announced on 26 November 2009 that Krychowiak joined Championnat National club Stade de Reims on loan until the end of the season. He then made his debut for the club, starting the whole game, in a 3–0 win against Beauvais Oise on 27 November 2009. Krychowiak quickly became a regular in the starting eleven and scored two goals to help the club win promotion to Ligue 2. At the end of the 2009–10 season, he went on to make 19 appearances and scored two times in all competitions.

Reims and Bordeaux agreed to extend Krychowiak's loan for another season. After scoring in the penalty shootout in a victory against Troyes in the first round of the Coupe de la Ligue, he then scored his first goal of the season in a 2–2 draw against Le Mans. Two weeks later against Angers on 5 November 2010, he was sent off for a second bookable offence, in a 2–0 win. Krychowiak later faced suspension on two occasions later in the 2010–11 season. Despite this, Krychowiak was a regular starter as the club finished 10th in its return to Ligue 2 and was voted by fans as the team's player of the season. Although Krychowiak usually plays as a defensive midfielder, on rare occasions he has also appeared in central defense. At the end of the 2010–11 season, Krychowiak made 40 appearances and scored two times in all competitions.

Following this, Krychowiak returned to Bordeaux for the 2011–12 season.

FC Nantes (loan)
However, Krychowiak's return to Bordeaux in the first half of the 2011–12 season restricted him to two appearances. On 17 November 2011, he joined Nantes on loan until the end of the season.

Krychowiak made his debut for the club as a starter in a 3–0 win against AS Monaco on 25 November 2011. Since joining Nantes, he continued to be a first team regular, playing in the defensive midfield position. At one point, Krychowiak played the centre-back position. Despite being suspended on three occasions later in the 2011–12 season, he went on to make 21 appearances in all competitions.

Stade Reims

In June 2012, Krychowiak signed a three-year contract with Stade de Reims who were newly promoted to Ligue 1. The move reportedly cost €800,000.

Krychowiak made his third debut for the club as a starter in a 1–0 loss against Marseille in the opening game of the season. Since joining Stade Reims on a permanent basis, he quickly established himself in the starting eleven, playing in the defensive midfield position. His performance against AS Nancy on 20 September 2012 drew comparison to Zlatan Ibrahimović after he set up one of the club's two goals in the game, with a 2–0 win. On 26 January 2013, Krychowiak scored his first goal for Reims in a 1–1 draw against Toulouse. He later scored three more goals, all of which were winning goals against Paris Saint-Germain, Lyon and Lorient. Despite missing three matches throughout the 2012–13 season, Krychowiak went on to make 36 appearances and scoring four times in all competitions.

Ahead of the 2013–14 season, Krychowiak was linked a move away from Stade de Reims but ended up staying at the club throughout the summer. In the opening game of the 2013–14 season, he scored his first goal of the season, in a 2–1 loss against Stade Rennais. Since the start of the 2013–14 season, Krychowiak continued to establish himself in the first team, playing the defensive midfield position. He made his 100th appearance for the club in a 0–0 draw against FC Nantes on 31 August 2013, coming on as a 56th-minute substitute. In a match against Marseille on 26 October 2013, he set up the winning goal for the club as they won 3–2. This was followed up by scoring his second goal of the season, in a 4–2 win against Bastia. He later scored two more goals later in the 2013–14 season. Despite being sidelined at least five occasions throughout the season, Krychowiak went on to make 36 appearances and scoring four times in all competitions.

Throughout the 2013–14 season, he continued to be linked a move away from Stade Reims. L'Union reported that he would leave the club at the end of the 2013–14 season.

Sevilla

In July 2014, Krychowiak joined La Liga side Sevilla for €4.5 million to play as a defensive midfielder.

He made his competitive debut on 12 August 2014 in the UEFA Super Cup at the Cardiff City Stadium, playing the full 90 minutes in a 2–0 defeat to Real Madrid. 11 days later, on 23 August 2014, Krychowiak made his La Liga debut for the club in a 1–1 draw against Valencia. Since making his debut for Sevilla, he quickly established himself in the starting eleven, playing in the midfield position. His performance earned praises from Marca, calling him the club's best signing this season. On 18 September 2014, Krychowiak scored his first goal for the club in a 2–0 win against Feyenoord in the UEFA Europa League group stage match. On 27 May 2015, he started for Sevilla in the 2015 UEFA Europa League Final in Poland's National Stadium in Warsaw, and scored the team's equalising goal in the 28th minute of an eventual 3–2 win over Dnipro, becoming the fifth Polish player to win the competition. He was the only Sevilla player named in the La Liga Team of the Season. Krychowiak made 48 appearances and scoring four times in all competitions.

On 11 August 2015, he started the season for Sevilla in the 2015 UEFA Super Cup 5–4 loss against Barcelona, and suffered a broken rib but still played the full 120 minutes. Having started in the centre-back position in the opening game of the season, he continued to play in the defensive midfield position. As a result, the club began talks with Krychowiak over a new contract. Manager Unai Emery praised his performance, calling "his sacrifice and dedication towards the team always puts them at their service". On 5 November 2015, Krychowiak signed a contract extension with Sevilla, keeping him at the club until 2019. Shortly after, he captained the club in a number of matches for the rest of the year. After serving a one match suspension, he then scored his first goal of the season, in a 2–0 win against rivals Real Betis in the first leg of the Copa del Rey last 16 tournament. Three days later, on 9 January 2016, he suffered a knee injury that saw him sidelined for two months. On 20 March 2016, Krychowiak returned to the starting line-up against Real Madrid, as the club lost 3–2. Since returning to the first team, he later contributed two assists in two second leg matches in the UEFA Europa League quarter-final and semi-finals against Athletic Bilbao and Shakhtar Donetsk respectively, to send Sevilla to the UEFA Europa League Final for the third time in a row. He started in the UEFA Europa League Final against Liverpool and played the whole game as they won 3–1, winning the tournament for the third time in a row.

Paris Saint-Germain

On 3 July 2016, Krychowiak returned to France, signing a five-year deal with champions Paris Saint-Germain for an undisclosed fee.

Following a two-match ban, he made his debut for the club, coming on as a second-half substitute, in a 1–1 draw against Saint-Étienne on 9 September 2016. Four days later on 13 September 2016, he started his first games for Paris Saint-Germain, as they drew 1–1 against Arsenal.

Throughout the season, Krychowiak found himself on the bench and only started six matches by the end of the first half of the season. This led manager Unai Emery commented about Krychowiak's first team status on two separate statements, saying: "I know him well, he can do more in the field but Krychowiak and Adrien Rabiot are prepared and will be important for the whole season. At the moment, I think the three you mentioned are the best for the team. Krychowiak is an experienced player. All are important."

By the second half of the season, however, Krychowiak's first team opportunities at the club became further limited, due to continuous competitions within the midfield position and his own injury concern. He later stated about his first team status: "Today I am in a difficult situation. But a lot of good players have been through this before me. It's not what I expected, but it's a test, and I have to get over it. [...] I never thought of leaving [...]. Leaving after six months would make no sense." Krychowiak appeared three times for Paris Saint-Germain in the second half of the season, including a historic 6–1 defeat to Barcelona, eliminating the club from the tournament. By the end of the 2016–17 season, he made 19 appearances in all competitions.

Following this, Krychowiak was named 'Flop of the Season' by Le Figaro. Despite this, he was linked a move away from Paris Saint-Germain in the summer transfer window. In response, Krychowiak wanted to stay at the club.

West Bromwich Albion (loan)
On 30 August 2017, it was announced that Krychowiak had joined Premier League club West Bromwich Albion on a season-long loan. On 14 October while on loan, Krychowiak said to the media that he felt deceived by Paris Saint-Germain manager Unai Emery, stating: "I spoke with the coach but every time when I spoke with him I felt deception. [...] The coach knows me very well. We spent two years together and before I signed the contract he told me to come to PSG, and I didn't play."

Krychowiak made his debut for the club in a 3–1 loss against Brighton & Hove Albion on 9 September 2017. Three weeks later, on 30 September 2017 against Watford, he set up West Bromwich Albion's first goal of the game, in a 2–2 draw. Since joining the club, Krychowiak became a first team regular for the side, playing in the midfield position. By November, he found himself placed on the substitute bench, with Jake Livermore and Sam Field preferred ahead of him. This led to reports over Krychowiak's future at the club, but new manager Alan Pardew wanted to keep him. As the season went by, he found himself alternating between the substitute bench and the starting eleven role. Krychowiak found himself in a controversy when he refused to shake Pardew's hand after being substituted in the 59th minute during a 4–1 loss against Leicester City on 10 March 2018. After the match, Krychowiak was criticised by Pardew for his actions and was fined as a result. This resulted in him being dropped to the substitute bench until Pardew's sacking. Following the appointment of Darren Moore, Krychowiak played the remaining matches of the season, as the club were relegated to the Championship. At the end of the 2017–18 season, Krychowiak made 31 appearances in all competitions. Following this, he returned to Paris Saint-Germain.

Lokomotiv Moscow (loan)

On 24 July 2018, Russian Premier League club Lokomotiv Moscow announced the signing of Krychowiak on a season-long loan deal with an obligation to buy for €10 million.

He made his debut for the club in a 0–0 draw against Spartak Moscow on 4 August 2018. Two weeks later on 19 August 2018, Krychowiak scored his first goal for Lokomotiv Moscow, in a 1–0 win against Krylia Sovetov Samara. This was followed up by setting up three assists in the next three matches, in which he was sent off for a second bookable offence against Dynamo Moscow. For his performance, Krychowiak was named the club's Player of the Month for August and then for November. He captained Lokomotiv Moscow for the first time in his career against Yenisey Krasnoyarsk in the round of 16 of the Russian Cup, only to receive a straight red card in the 71st minute, as the club won 4–1 to advance to the next round. Since joining Lokomotiv Moscow, Krychowiak established himself in the first team, playing in different midfield positions, and also rotated playing in the centre-back position. On 10 May 2019, Krychowiak scored his second goal of the season, in a 4–0 win against Rubin Kazan. He then started in the centre-back position in the Russian Cup Final against Ural Yekaterinburg and helped the club win 1–0 to win the tournament. Following this, Krychowiak said the season was successful, having helped Lokomotiv Moscow finish second place in the league and winning the Russian Cup. At the end of the 2018–19 season, he went on to make 39 appearances and scoring two times in all competitions.

Lokomotiv Moscow

On 3 July 2019, Lokomotiv announced that Krychowiak signed a contract with the club on a permanent basis. The move later reported to have cost €10 million.

His first game after signing for the club on a permanent basis came on 6 July 2019 against Zenit Saint Petersburg in the Russian Super Cup, as he set up Lokomotiv Moscow's second goal of the game in a 3–2 win. Krychowiak's performance saw him being named the club's Player of the Month in the first three months to the season. After missing two matches due to suspension and injury, Krychowiak returned to the first team in a 3–0 loss against Spartak Moscow on 27 October 2019. Two weeks later, in a match against FC Krasnodar on 10 November 2019, Krychowiak suffered an injury that saw him substituted at half time. After the match, it was revealed that he suffered a concussion, but quickly recovered. He scored twice in a follow-up match, in a 3–2 win against Tambov. As a result, Krychowiak was named Lokomotiv Moscow's Player of the Month for November. Following this, he remained in the first team until the season was suspended because of the COVID-19 pandemic in Russia. In the league's last match before the suspension, he scored his 10th goal of the season in a 3–1 win against Rostov. Following this, Krychowiak was named the club's Player of the Month for March. He remained an integral part of the team once the season resumed behind closed doors and made six further appearances, helping Lokomotiv Moscow qualify for the UEFA Champions League next season.

At the start of the 2020–21 season, Krychowiak once again started in the Russian Super Cup against Zenit Saint Petersburg, as Lokomotiv Moscow lost 2–1. He started the next five matches before suffering a muscle injury that saw him miss one match. After returning from injury, then scored his second goal of the season, in a 1–0 win against FC Ufa on 17 October 2020.

Krasnodar
On 1 August 2021, both Lokomotiv and FC Krasnodar announced that the clubs agreed on the transfer conditions for Krychowiak's move to Krasnodar, and the transfer will be made official after he passes the medical examination and signs a personal contract with Krasnodar. On 2 August, Krasnodar announced that he signed a three-year contract with the club. On 7 March 2022, FIFA announced that foreign players in Russia would be able to unilaterally suspend their contracts with their clubs until 30 June 2022 and sign with a club outside of Russia until 30 June 2022, and the transfer window is reopened for such players to sign and get registered for the new club until 7 April 2022. On 15 March 2022, FC Krasnodar announced that Krychowiak notified the club that he decided to use the new regulations and suspend his contract until 30 June 2022.

AEK Athens (loan)
On 15 March 2022, Krychowiak signed with AEK Athens until the end of the 2021–22 season.

Al-Shabab (loan)
On 8 July 2022, Krychowiak joined Al-Shabab in Saudi Arabia on a season-long loan.

International career

Youth career
Krychowiak represented Poland under-20s at the 2007 FIFA U-20 World Cup and scored a free kick against Brazil, the only goal of the match. He was the youngest outfield player named to the Polish U20 squad. He helped the U20 national side progress before being eliminated by Argentina U20 in the round of 16 of the tournament. Krychowiak went on to make seven appearances and scoring once for the U20 side.

In May 2009, Krychowiak was called up to the Poland U21 team for the first time. He made his U21 debut, playing the whole game in the centre-back position, in a 2–1 loss against Sweden U21 on 5 June 2009.

Two years later, Krychowiak was called up to the U21 team for the first time. He his first appearances in a 3–0 win against Albania U21 on 2 September 2011. This was followed up by captaining the U21 side in a 2–0 loss against Russia U21. On 11 October 2011, he scored his first Poland U21 goal, in a 4–3 win against Albania U21. Krychowiak then scored twice for the U21 side in a 4–2 win against Moldova U21 on 1 June 2012. He went on to make 11 appearances and scoring three times for Poland U21.

Senior career

In December 2008, Krychowiak was called up to the senior squad for the first time. He made his first appearance in a friendly against Serbia on 14 December 2008. Since the game was not on an official FIFA date, the teams were mostly composed of players from the domestic leagues, as well as a few reserve players; however, it was counted as an official match.

Called up to the Poland team in August 2009, Krychowiak was next called up to the national team almost two years later in February 2011, making his first appearances in almost three years, coming on as a last minute substitute in a 1–0 win against Norway on 6 February 2011.

In August 2012, Krychowiak was called up to the national team after a year in abayance. He made an appearance against Moldova on 11 September 2012, coming on as a substitute in a 2–0 win. His first start for Poland came on 12 October 2012 against South Africa as they won 1–0. He played a number of matches as Poland failed to qualify for the FIFA World Cup in Brazil.

Krychowiak continued to feature in the national team, playing the defensive midfield position in effort to qualify for the UEFA Euro 2016 in France. On 14 November 2014, he scored his first international goal in a 4–0 UEFA Euro 2016 qualifying win in Georgia. He scored his second goal in Poland's final qualifying match against Ireland in a 2–1 victory which made Poland qualify for Euro 2016. In May 2016, Krychowiak was called by the national team for the UEFA Euro 2016 preliminary squad and later made the cut to be included in the 23 man squad ahead of the tournament. In Poland's opening game against Northern Ireland, he was voted man of the match following Poland's first ever win at a European Championship. Krychowiak played in the next two matches against Germany and Ukraine, earning a total four points to help Poland qualify for the knockout stage. He started the whole game and scored the final penalty in a 5–4 penalty shootout win over Switzerland in the round of 16. Krychowiak played every minute of the national side's historic Euro 2016 campaign, which ended in the quarter-finals losing to Portugal 3–5 in a penalty shootout. Following this, he was named Team of the Tournament by the EFE.

Following the end of the UEFA Euro 2016 tournament, Krychowiak helped Poland earn a total of ten points in the FIFA World Cup qualification – UEFA Group E. He captained Poland for the first time, playing 45 minutes before being substituted in a 1–1 draw against Slovenia. He later helped the national side qualify for the 2018 FIFA World Cup. In May 2018, he was named in Poland's preliminary 35-man squad for the FIFA World Cup in Russia and later made the cut to be included in the 23 man squad. In the 2018 World Cup match against Senegal, Krychowiak caused M'Baye Niang's goal to give Senegal a 2–0 lead. After that error, he scored a goal himself, but Poland still lost 2–1 and they were later eliminated from the competition.

Following the end of the World Cup, Krychowiak played three out of the four matches in the UEFA Nations League, as Poland finished third place in Group 3. He then started the whole UEFA Euro 2020 qualifying matches to help Poland qualify for the UEFA Euro 2020.

Personal life
In December 2019, Krychowiak married his longtime girlfriend, Celia Jaunat, whom they first met in 2010 and began dating two years later.

Krychowiak runs a boutique business with his brother. In May 2020, he invested over €1 million in a Polish construction startup called SYSTEM 3E. He said in an interview that he does not go to parties or drink alcohol.

In addition to speaking Polish, Krychowiak speaks French, Spanish and English. His fluency in Spanish contributed to him settling well in Sevilla. Since moving to Moscow, he began learning Russian. Krychowiak also began learning Italian in hopes of playing for an Italian club in the future.

During his third spell at Stade de Reims, Krychowiak was dubbed by the L'Union as "the Polish Terminator". While playing for Lokomotiv Moscow, he was called "Krykha" by his teammates, due to their difficulties of pronouncing his name. Krychowiak is good friends with Wojciech Szczęsny, having known each other since 2004. He completed a two-year studies at the Claude Bernard University Lyon 1.

Career statistics

Club

International

Scores and results list Poland's goal tally first.

Honours
Sevilla
UEFA Europa League: 2014–15, 2015–16

Paris Saint-Germain
Coupe de France: 2016–17
Coupe de la Ligue: 2016–17

Lokomotiv Moscow
Russian Cup: 2018–19, 2020–21
Russian Super Cup: 2019

Individual
La Liga Team of the Season: 2014–15
UEFA Europa League Squad of the Season: 2014–15, 2015–16

References

External links

National team stats at pzpn.pl 

1990 births
Living people
People from Gryfice
Polish footballers
Poland youth international footballers
Poland under-21 international footballers
Poland international footballers
Association football midfielders
FC Girondins de Bordeaux players
Stade de Reims players
FC Nantes players
Sevilla FC players
Paris Saint-Germain F.C. players
West Bromwich Albion F.C. players
FC Lokomotiv Moscow players
FC Krasnodar players
AEK Athens F.C. players
Al-Shabab FC (Riyadh) players
Ligue 1 players
Ligue 2 players
Championnat National players
La Liga players
Premier League players
Russian Premier League players
Super League Greece players
Saudi Professional League players
Polish expatriate footballers
Expatriate footballers in France
Expatriate footballers in Spain
Expatriate footballers in England
Expatriate footballers in Russia
Expatriate footballers in Greece
Expatriate footballers in Saudi Arabia
Sportspeople from West Pomeranian Voivodeship
Polish expatriate sportspeople in France
Polish expatriate sportspeople in Spain
Polish expatriate sportspeople in England
Polish expatriate sportspeople in Russia
Polish expatriate sportspeople in Greece
Polish expatriate sportspeople in Saudi Arabia
UEFA Euro 2016 players
2018 FIFA World Cup players
UEFA Euro 2020 players
2022 FIFA World Cup players
UEFA Europa League winning players